Anna Kay (born 6 May 1999) is a British professional cyclist who specializes in cyclo-cross. She won the silver medal in the under-23 race at the 2019 European Cyclo-cross Championships, and bronze at the women's under-23 race at the 2020 UCI Cyclo-cross World Championships.

Major results

Cyclo-cross

2017–2018
 3rd Overall National Trophy Series
2nd Ipswich
3rd Derby
3rd Abergavenny
 3rd National Under-23 Championships
2018–2019
 2nd Overall National Trophy Series
1st Crawley
2nd Derby
2nd Ipswich
2nd Shrewsbury
3rd Irvine
 2nd National Championships
2019–2020
 2nd  UEC European Under-23 Championships
 Ethias Cross
2nd Bredene
3rd Eeklo
3rd Essen
 3rd  UCI World Under-23 Championships
 3rd National Championships
 UCI World Cup
3rd Bern
 3rd Overall UCI Under-23 World Cup
 3rd Otegem
2021–2022
 Ethias Cross
1st Leuven
3rd Essen
 National Trophy Series
1st Broughton Hall
 3rd National Championships
2022–2023
 National Trophy Series
1st Derby
1st South Shields
 2nd  Team relay, UCI World Championships

Mountain Bike

2021
 National Cross Country Series
1st Monmouth
2nd Ringwood
 2nd National Under-23 XCO Championships

References

External links

 
 

1999 births
Living people
Sportspeople from Gateshead
English female cyclists
Cyclo-cross cyclists